Thomas Harrison Clegg (16 October 1934 – 24 July 2016) was a British television and film director. He was known as an action director, responsible for many episodes of The Sweeney, its cinema version Sweeney 2 (1978), and Sharpe. Between 1952 and 1954, he performed national service in the Royal Air Force.

Selected filmography
Television
 Special Branch (1973–74)
 Space: 1999 (1975–77)
 The Sweeney (1975–78)
 A Captain's Tale (1982)
 Frederick Forsyth Presents (1989 and 1990)
 Sharpe (1993-2008)
 Bravo Two Zero (1999)
 Adventure Inc. (2002-2003)
 Rosemary & Thyme (2003)

Film
 Love Is a Splendid Illusion (1970)
 Sweeney 2 (1978)
 McVicar (1980)
 G'olé! (1983)
 The Inside Man (1984)
 Any Man's Death (1990)

References

External links

 Obituary - The Telegraph

1934 births
2016 deaths
20th-century Royal Air Force personnel
Action film directors
British film directors
British television directors
People from Lancashire (before 1974)